Adégbìtẹ́ is both a surname and a given name of Yoruba origin, meaning "the crown or royalty receives a nest or throne". Notable people with the surname include:

 Damilola Adegbite (born 1985), Nigerian actress, model and television personality
 Lateef Adegbite (1933–2012), Nigerian lawyer and politician
 Razaq Adegbite (born 1992), Nigerian footballer
 Taofik Adegbite, Nigerian businessman

References